Henry L. Warner (March 6, 1833 – July 20, 1897) was an American farmer and politician from New York who served as a member of the New York State Assembly in 1892.

Background 
Warner was born on March 6, 1833, in Canaan, New York. He worked as a farmer in Canaan Four Corners.

In 1891, Warner was elected to the New York State Assembly as a Democrat, representing Columbia County. He served in the Assembly in 1892.

Warner was married to Sarah Barnes, the daughter of Daniel D. Barnes. Their children were E. A. Corey, D. D., Harry, Fred, Hattie Chapin, Anna, and Charles. He was a prominent member of the local Congregational church.

Warner died on July 20, 1897. He was buried in Canaan Centre cemetery.

References

External links 

 The Political Graveyard

1833 births
1897 deaths
People from Canaan, New York
Farmers from New York (state)
19th-century American politicians
Democratic Party members of the New York State Assembly
Burials in New York (state)